There are 29 churches and other places of worship in the borough of Epsom and Ewell, one of 11 local government districts in the English county of Surrey. Another three buildings were formerly used for worship but are now in alternative uses.

Census statistics show that the majority of the borough's 75,000 residents are Christian, and most places of worship belong to Christian denominations.  There are significant minorities of Muslims and Hindus as well, and these groups each have one venue for their worship.  Many churches and chapels date from the 20th century—a period of rapid population growth in the area, which is just outside London—but the towns of Ewell and Epsom are older and have parish churches with ancient origins.

English Heritage has awarded listed status to four places of worship in the borough of Epsom and Ewell.  A building is defined as "listed" when it is placed on a statutory register of buildings of "special architectural or historic interest" in accordance with the Planning (Listed Buildings and Conservation Areas) Act 1990.  The Department for Culture, Media and Sport, a Government department, is responsible for this; English Heritage, a non-departmental public body, acts as an agency of the department to administer the process and advise the department on relevant issues.  There are three grades of listing status. Grade I, the highest, is defined as being of "exceptional interest"; Grade II* is used for "particularly important buildings of more than special interest"; and Grade II, the lowest, is used for buildings of "special interest".  As of February 2001, there were no Grade I-listed buildings, 15 with Grade II* status and 307 Grade II-listed buildings in the borough.  The borough council also maintains a list of locally listed buildings, of which there are 65 .  One of these is a place of worship.  Such buildings are of "local architectural or historic interest" and are given extra protection under the borough's local plan.

Overview of the borough

Epsom and Ewell is the smallest of Surrey's 11 local government districts: it covers approximately 8,425 acres (3,409 ha) in the north of the county, adjacent to Greater London.  The population was estimated at 68,000 in 2004, but the 2011 Census revealed that more than 75,000 people lived in the borough.  Clockwise from the north, it has boundaries with the Royal Borough of Kingston upon Thames and the London Borough of Sutton, both in Greater London; and the boroughs and districts of Reigate and Banstead and Mole Valley in Surrey.  The largest places are the town of Ewell, which originated in the Roman era, and neighbouring Epsom—a fashionable spa town in the 17th and 18th centuries.  Its early growth was encouraged by the discovery of Epsom Salts in 1618 and the founding of The Derby horse race in 1779.  Extensive suburban development followed the opening of railway lines in the mid-19th century, and in the interwar the Worcester Park and Stoneleigh areas were laid out on farmland.  Further growth came in the 1990s when five 19th- and early-20th-century psychiatric hospitals at Horton, Epsom were demolished and replaced with housing.

Ewell developed from 70 AD around a bend in Stane Street, a major Roman road.  It was Surrey's largest settlement by 150 AD.  Land in the area was later within the royal demesne or—in the case of the manor of Fitznells, documented as early as 675—owned by Chertsey Abbey.  Its ancient parish church, dedicated to St Mary the Virgin, was replaced by a new church within the same churchyard in 1848, but the 15th-century tower survives from the earlier building.  Land in the Epsom area was granted to Chertsey Abbey in 727, and the manor of Epsom still belonged to it at the time of the Domesday survey in 1086.  At that time there were two churches in Epsom, "but all trace of one has disappeared"; the other, the much rebuilt St Martin's Church, is still the town's parish church.  Cuddington, a medieval village near Ewell with its own church, was demolished in the 16th century to allow Nonsuch Palace and its associated parks to be built.  The parish name is still in use today, and a new church was built in the Worcester Park suburb in the north of the district.  Other Anglican churches were provided throughout the Victorian era and into the 20th century as the population grew: Christ Church, St Barnabas' and St John's in Epsom, All Saints at West Ewell, St John the Baptist's Church at Stoneleigh (1939), St Stephen-on-the-Downs at Langley Vale (1961) and St Paul's at Howell Hill, between Ewell and Cheam (1989).

Benedictine monks from a chapel in nearby Cheam were responsible for Roman Catholic worshippers between the early 19th century and 1859, when the priest of the Croydon Catholic Mission founded a Mass centre in a house near Epsom railway station.  A permanent church was built between 1861 and 1865 and was rebuilt on the same site in 1930 and 1961 as congregations grew.  This was in turn replaced by a new church on a much larger site in 1999–2001.  The Worcester Park area became a separate parish in 1906; its church, St Matthias, founded St Clement's Church at Ewell as a Mass centre in 1937.  It was parished four years later and the present church building was erected in 1962.

Protestant Nonconformism has a long history in the borough.  William Bugby founded Bugby Chapel in Epsom in 1779; he was influenced by famous Calvinist preacher William Huntington, whose early preaching and first conversion of another person took place at West Ewell.  The chapel later adopted a Unitarian character, then it became Salem Strict Baptist Chapel.  In 1954, after this congregation moved to a new chapel, the building was rededicated as a synagogue—a role which it retained until the 1990s.  Illegal Presbyterian meetings took place in Epsom from 1667, or possibly as early as the Great Ejection which followed the Act of Uniformity 1662, and congregations rose to 300 by the early 18th century.  A permanent meeting room was licensed in 1724; after a period of closure it was reopened as an Independent Congregational church in 1805.  This building was restored in 1846, but a new church was built in 1904.  This was damaged by fire in 1961, and the present Epsom United Reformed Church—successor to the 17th-century cause—was completed in 1963.  Baptists have met in Epsom since 1899, and their present chapel was registered for marriages in 1909.  A Strict Baptist congregation which met at Bugby Chapel from 1899 later moved to a new building elsewhere in Epsom.  There was a Wesleyan Methodist chapel in Epsom from 1847, when a barn was converted for the use of worshippers, and the present town-centre building was completed in 1914.  Stoneleigh also has its own Methodist and Baptist churches, both registered for marriages in the early 1940s.  In the postwar period, several Evangelical groups opened churches in Epsom and Ewell, such as the Epsom Christian Fellowship, Christ Church Ewell (originally Staneway Chapel) and West Ewell Evangelical Church.  Jehovah's Witnesses meet at a Kingdom Hall at Banstead Road in Ewell, and nearby on the same road is a Latter-day Saints meetinghouse.  This made headlines in 1977 when a Latter-day Saint missionary was abducted from outside it in a sex scandal which became known as the Mormon sex in chains case.  There is a mosque and Islamic community centre in a former church hall in Epsom, and at Stoneleigh a building is used as a Hindu temple and prayer hall.

The borough has an estimated 23 active Christian churches for 79,600 inhabitants, a ratio of one church to every 3,460 people. This is one of the highest in the country.

Religious affiliation
According to the United Kingdom Census 2011, 75,102 people lived in the borough of Epsom and Ewell.  Of these, 61.55% identified themselves as Christian, 3.03% were Muslim, 2.55% were Hindu, 0.64% were Buddhist, 0.32% were Jewish, 0.17% were Sikh, 0.35% followed another religion, 24.31% claimed no religious affiliation and 7.09% did not state their religion.  The proportion of Christians was higher than the 59.38% in England as a whole.  Similarly, the national percentages of Muslims (5.02%), Sikhs (0.79%) and Jews (0.49%), adherents of religions not mentioned in the Census (0.43%) and people with no religious affiliation (24.74%) were all slightly higher than those reported in the borough.  Hindus and Buddhists were more prevalent, though: in 2011, 1.52% of people in England were Hindu and 0.45% were Buddhist.

Administration
The Diocese of Guildford, whose cathedral is at Guildford in Surrey, is responsible for all of Epsom and Ewell's Anglican churches.  All ten—three at Epsom, two at West Ewell and one each at Ewell, Howell Hill, Langley Vale, Stoneleigh and Worcester Park—are part of the diocese's Archdeaconry of Dorking and, at a lower level, the Epsom Deanery.

Epsom's and Ewell's Roman Catholic churches are part of Epsom Deanery, one of 13 deaneries in the Roman Catholic Diocese of Arundel and Brighton, whose cathedral is at Arundel in West Sussex.

Epsom Baptist Church and Stoneleigh Baptist Church are administered by the East Surrey District of the London Baptist Association, while the Grace Baptist Church Epsom maintains links with GraceNet UK, an association of Reformed Evangelical Christian churches and organisations.  The Sutton Methodist Circuit covers Epsom Methodist Church, while the church at Stoneleigh and the joint Anglican/Methodist Ruxley Church at West Ewell are in the Wimbledon Circuit.  The Southern Synod, one of 13 synods of the United Reformed Church in the United Kingdom, administers that denomination's churches at Epsom and Ewell.  West Ewell Evangelical Church belongs to two Evangelical groups: the Fellowship of Independent Evangelical Churches (FIEC), a pastoral and administrative network of about 500 churches with an evangelical outlook; and Affinity (formerly the British Evangelical Council), a network of conservative Evangelical congregations throughout Great Britain.  Grace Baptist Church Epsom is also a member of Affinity.  Christ Church Ewell, another Evangelical church, was founded as an independent Open Brethren congregation under the name Staneway Chapel before adopting an Evangelical character and a new name in 2002.

Listed status

Current places of worship

Former places of worship

Former places of worship demolished since 2000

Notes

References

Bibliography

 (Available online in 14 parts; Guide to abbreviations on page 6)

Epsom and Ewell
Epsom and Ewell
Epsom and Ewell
Churches
Epsom and Ewell places of worship